A k-rough number, as defined by Finch in 2001 and 2003, is a positive integer whose prime factors are all greater than or equal to k. k-roughness has alternately been defined as requiring all prime factors to strictly exceed k.

Examples (after Finch)
Every odd positive integer is 3-rough.
Every positive integer that is congruent to 1 or 5 mod 6 is 5-rough.
Every positive integer is 2-rough, since all its prime factors, being prime numbers, exceed 1.

See also
 Buchstab function, used to count rough numbers
 Smooth number

Notes

References 
 
 Finch's definition from Number Theory Archives
 "Divisibility, Smoothness and Cryptographic Applications", D. Naccache and I. E. Shparlinski, pp. 115–173 in Algebraic Aspects of Digital Communications, eds. Tanush Shaska and Engjell Hasimaj, IOS Press, 2009, .	

The On-Line Encyclopedia of Integer Sequences (OEIS)
lists p-rough numbers for small p:
 2-rough numbers: A000027
 3-rough numbers: A005408
 5-rough numbers: A007310
 7-rough numbers: A007775
 11-rough numbers: A008364
 13-rough numbers: A008365
 17-rough numbers: A008366
 19-rough numbers: A166061
 23-rough numbers: A166063

Integer sequences